Nassif  A. Ghoussoub  is a Canadian mathematician working in the fields of non-linear analysis and partial differential equations. He is a Professor of Mathematics and a Distinguished University Scholar at the University of British Columbia.

Early life and education 
Ghoussoub was born to Lebanese parents in Western Africa (now Mali).

He completed his doctorat 3ème cycle (PhD) in 1975, and a Doctorat d'Etat in 1979 at the Pierre and Marie Curie University, where his advisors were Gustave Choquet and Antoine Brunel.

Career 
Ghoussoub completed his post-doctoral fellowship at the Ohio State University during 1976–77. He then joined the University of British Columbia, where he currently holds a position of Professor of Mathematics and a Distinguished University Scholar. Ghoussoub is known for his work in functional analysis, non-linear analysis, and partial differential equations.

He was vice-president of the Canadian Mathematical Society from 1994 to 1996, the founding director of the Pacific Institute for the Mathematical Sciences (PIMS) for the period 1996–2003, the co-editor-in-chief of the Canadian Journal of Mathematics during 1993–2002, a co-founder of the MITACS Network of Centres of Excellence, and is the founder and current scientific director of the Banff International Research Station (BIRS). In 1994, Ghoussoub became a fellow of the Royal Society of Canada, and in 2012, a fellow of the American Mathematical Society.

Ghoussoub has been awarded multiple awards and distinctions, including the Coxeter-James prize in 1990, and the Jeffrey-Williams prize in 2007. He holds honorary doctorates from the Université Paris-Dauphine (France), and the University of Victoria (Canada). He was awarded the Queen Elizabeth II Diamond Jubilee Medal in 2012, and appointed to the Order of Canada in 2015, with the grade of officer for contributions to mathematics, research, and education.

In 2018, Ghoussoub was elected a faculty representative on the University of British Columbia's Board of Governors. He will serve until February 29, 2020. Ghoussoub has previously served two consecutive terms in this role from 2008 to 2014.

Ghoussoub's scholarly work has been cited over 5,900 times and has an h-index of 40.

Awards 
 Coxeter-James Prize, Canadian Mathematical Society (1990)
 Killam Senior Research Fellowship, UBC (1992)
 Fellow of the Royal Society of Canada (1994)
 Distinguished University Scholar, UBC (2003)
 Doctorat Honoris Causa, Paris Dauphine University  
 Jeffery–Williams Prize, Canadian mathematical Society (2007) 
 Faculty of Science Achievement Award for outstanding service and leadership, UBC (2007)
 David Borwein Distinguished Career Award, Canadian Mathematical Society (2010)
 Fellow of the American Mathematical Society (2012)
 Queen Elizabeth II Diamond Jubilee Medal (2012)
 Honorary Doctor of Science-University of Victoria (June 2015)
 Officer of the Order of Canada (December 2015)
 Inaugural fellow of the Canadian Mathematical Society, 2018

Bibliography

Selected Academic Publications

Books

See also
 Banff International Research Station

References

External links
 Nassif Ghoussoub's homepage
 Piece of Mind, Nassif's personal blog
 A biography

Living people
20th-century Canadian mathematicians
21st-century Canadian mathematicians
Canadian people of Lebanese descent
Mathematical analysts
Academic staff of the University of British Columbia
Pierre and Marie Curie University alumni
Fellows of the Royal Society of Canada
Fellows of the American Mathematical Society
Fellows of the Canadian Mathematical Society
Functional analysts
PDE theorists
Officers of the Order of Canada
1953 births